The 2005 Governor General's Awards for Literary Merit: Finalists in 14 categories (69 books) were announced October 17, winners announced November 16. The four children's literature awards were presented November 22, others presented November 23. The prize for writers and illustrators was $15,000 and "a specially crafted copy of the winning book bound by Montreal bookbinder Lise Dubois".

The winners were announced at the Bibliothèque nationale du Québec in Montreal, rather than at Library and Archives Canada in Ottawa, "[i]n honour of the designation of Montreal as UNESCO World Book Capital for 2005–2006".

As introduced in 2003, the four children's literature awards were announced and presented separately from the others. The event at Rideau Hall, the Governor General's residence in Ottawa, was scheduled to begin at 10:00 on a Tuesday morning. "Children from across the National Capital Region will be invited to attend the event, which will also include readings and workshops by the award winners."

English

French

References

External links
CBC: David Gilmour wins GG for English fiction

Governor General's Awards
Governor General's Awards
Governor General's Awards